The 2005 Rafael Nadal tennis season is regarded as one of the greatest seasons of all time by a teenager. Nadal won a career-best 11 singles titles, including then-season-record 4 Masters 1000 titles and his maiden Grand Slam title at the French Open on his first attempt, making him the first teenager since Pete Sampras (1990 US Open) to win a major. He finished the year with 79 calendar match wins, the most by any teenager in ATP Tour history, and the world No. 2 ranking. He was awarded the ATP Most Improved Player of the Year award.

Australian Open 
At the 2005 Australian Open, Nadal lost in the fourth round to eventual runner-up Lleyton Hewitt.

Hard court 
Nadal reached the final of the 2005 Miami Masters, and despite being two points from a straight-sets victory, he was defeated in five sets by Roger Federer.

Clay court 
Nadal dominated the 2005 clay court season. He won 24 consecutive singles matches, which broke Andre Agassi's Open Era record of consecutive match wins for a male teenager. Nadal won the Torneo Conde de Godó in Barcelona and beat 2004 French Open runner-up Guillermo Coria in the finals of the 2005 Monte Carlo Masters and the 2005 Rome Masters. During the Rome quarterfinals against Radek Stepanek, Nadal hit what is considered by many as the greatest shot of his career, a no-look, running passing shot near the net. These victories raised his ranking to world No. 5 and made him one of the favorites at his career-first French Open. On his 19th birthday, Nadal defeated Federer in the 2005 French Open semifinals, as one of only four players who defeated the world No. 1 that year (along with Marat Safin, Richard Gasquet, and David Nalbandian). Two days later, he defeated Mariano Puerta in the final, becoming the second male player after Mats Wilander to win the French Open on his first attempt. He also became the first male teenager to win a Grand Slam singles title since Pete Sampras won the 1990 US Open at age 19. Winning the French Open improved Nadal's ranking to world No. 3.

Grass court 
Three days after his victory in Paris, Nadal's 24-match winning streak was snapped in the first round of the grass court Gerry Weber Open in Halle, Germany, where he lost to the German Alexander Waske. He then lost in the second round of 2005 Wimbledon to Gilles Müller of Luxembourg.

Summer hard court 
Immediately after Wimbledon, Nadal won 16 consecutive matches and three consecutive tournaments, bringing his ranking to world No. 2 on 25 July 2005. Nadal started his North American summer hard-court season by defeating Agassi in the final of the 2005 Canada Masters, but lost in the first round of the 2005 Cincinnati Masters. Nadal was seeded second at the 2005 US Open, where he was upset in the third round by world No. 49 James Blake in four sets.

In September, he defeated Coria in the final of the China Open in Beijing and won both of his Davis Cup matches against Italy. In October, he won his fourth ATP Masters Series title of the year, defeating Ivan Ljubičić in the final of the 2005 Madrid Masters. He then suffered a foot injury that prevented him from competing in the year-ending Tennis Masters Cup.

Both Nadal and Federer won eleven singles titles and four ATP Masters Series titles in 2005. Nadal broke Mats Wilander's previous teenage record of nine in 1983. Eight of Nadal's titles were on clay, and the remainder were on hard courts. Nadal won 79 matches, second only to Federer's 81.

Singles Matches

See also
 2005 ATP Tour
 2005 Roger Federer tennis season

References

External links 
  
 ATP tour profile

Rafael Nadal tennis seasons
Nadal, Rafael